Pandanus fanningensis is a species of flowering plant in the family Pandanaceae, native to the island of Tabuaeran (Fanning Island) in the Line Islands.

References

fanningensis
Flora of the Line Islands
Plants described in 1974
Flora without expected TNC conservation status